The Shire of Allora was a local government area north of the regional centre of Warwick in the Darling Downs region of Queensland.

History
The Borough of Allora came into being on 21 July 1869 under the Municipal Institutions Act 1864. The surrounding region was incorporated on 11 November 1879 as the Clifton Division under the Divisional Boards Act 1879. With the passage of the Local Authorities Act 1902, the Municipality of Allora became the Town of Allora and Clifton Division became Shire of Clifton on 31 March 1903. On 23 January 1915, the Town of Allora was abolished and merged with the southern part of the Shire of Clifton to create the Shire of Allora. The Shire's offices were located at 78 Herbert Street, Allora.

On 19 March 1992, the Electoral and Administrative Review Commission, created two years earlier, produced its report External Boundaries of Local Authorities, and recommended that local government boundaries in the Warwick area be rationalised into 3 new local government areas.  That recommendation was not implemented, but the outcome was that the Shire of Allora was merged with the Shires of Glengallan and Rosenthal and the City of Warwick to form a new Shire of Warwick. The Local Government (Allora, Glengallan, Rosenthal and Warwick) Regulation 1994 was gazetted on 20 May 1994. On 25 June, an election was held for the new council, and on 1 July 1994, the Shire of Allora was abolished.

Towns and localities
The Shire of Allora included the following settlements:

 Allora
 Berat
 Clintonvale
 Deuchar
 Ellinthorp
 Goomburra
 Hendon
 Mount Marshall
 Talgai
 Willowvale

Chairmen and Mayors

Chairmen of Shire of Allora 
 1927: Thomas Muir

Mayors of Town of Allora
 1906: W. Deacon

Population

References

External links
 Local Government (Allora, Glengallan, Rosenthal and Warwick) Regulation 1994
 University of Queensland: Queensland Places: Allora Shire

Former local government areas of Queensland
1994 disestablishments in Australia